Chinook Valley is an unincorporated community in northern Alberta under the jurisdiction of the County of Northern Lights.

Its first school was established in 1929.

References

Localities in the County of Northern Lights